Sud (English: South) is a 71-minute 1999 Belgian-Finnish-French English-language independent documentary art film directed by Chantal Akerman.

Reception

The film, which premiered at the 1999 Cannes Film Festival (where it was nominated for the International Confederation of Art Cinemas Award) and was released on DVD in 2016 as part of a boxset also containing D’Est (1993), De l’autre côté (2002), and Down There (2006), examines the effect of the dragging death of James Byrd Jr. on the residents in Jasper, Texas.

References

External links

1999 documentary films
1999 independent films
1999 films
Belgian documentary films
Belgian independent films
Documentary films about crime in the United States
Films about murder
Films directed by Chantal Akerman
Films set in Alabama
Films set in Atlanta
Films set in Texas
Films shot in Alabama
Films shot in Atlanta
Films shot in Texas
Finnish documentary films
French documentary films
French independent films
1990s English-language films
1990s French films